John Isaiah Caldwell (born c. 1828) was an American attorney, miner, businessman, and school trustee.

Career
Caldwell was a native of Champaign County, Ohio. He received his legal education in his native state, being a student under Judge John A. Corwin, who was elected Chief Justice of Ohio in 1851, and was admitted to practice before the Supreme Court at Columbus, Ohio. From there he went to Lexington, Missouri, where he was likewise admitted to practice before the Supreme Court sitting in banc. In 1850, Caldwell set out for California across the plains, arriving in Sacramento on August 12 of that year. The train of which he was a member, when it set out from Lexington, Missouri, consisted of twenty-three wagons. At Independence Rock, Caldwell left the train and packed alone over the mountains and into California, beating the company by sixty days and thus escaping the cholera, which at that time was raging fiercely along the emigrant road. For a time, he mined on the American River, near Folsom, CaliforniaFolsom, but in October he set out for Nevada County, arriving first at Rough and Ready, then the most lively camp in the state. Here he remained during the ensuing winter, going in the early spring with a company of fifteen others to the North Yuba River, where they located a mining claim, calling it the Missouri Bar. On July 3, 1851, having completed their dam, they proceeded to prospect the claim, and found it would pay well. Caldwell continued there until late in November of that year. and then sold out and went back to Missouri by way of Panama.

In the spring of 1854, he returned once more to California, coming via New Orleans and the Nicaragua route. He went at once to Nevada City, arriving there June 23, 1854, and at once "hung out his shingle" and began the successful practice of his profession, which he has continued since. In December 1854, Caldwell was admitted as an attorney at law in the Supreme Court of California in Sacramento, and thus is one of the older practitioners of the state, and he has been counsel also in some of the most prominent cases in Nevada County.  In 1869, he was elected District Attorney, taking the office in 1870 and holding it for two years. It may also be stated that he was interested in a great many mining operations, both quartz and placer, during his residence.

Caldwell was an active promoter of education, encouraging by all means in his power the public schools of Nevada City, not only by his presence, but in aiding out of his private means and in other ways the erection of suitable buildings. The building now known as the Washington School House was planned and constructed while he was a Trustee, being chiefly engineered by him and his co-Trustees. They bought the lot, laid the foundation, and when the school funds were exhausted he, in company with his brother Trustees, A. B. Gregory and E. G. Waite (the place of the latter being later filled by E. F. Spence), shouldered the expense of erecting the building, this being afterward refunded by the people of Nevada City. Caldwell continued to be a Trustee for eight years, paying during that time out of his own pocket hundreds of dollars for poor people.

Caldwell encouraged farming and fruit-raising wherever practicable in the county. He was an unmarried man.

References

1828 births
People from Champaign County, Ohio
People from Nevada City, California
People of the California Gold Rush
Missouri lawyers
Ohio lawyers
School board members in California
District attorneys in California
Year of death missing